Stu Holt (born December 1972) is an American football coach and former player. He is currently the running backs coach and special teams coordinator for Virginia Tech, coaching under first-year head coach Brent Pry. Holt is also the assistant head coach-offense for the Hokies. He played college football for North Carolina from 1992–1995.

Playing career
Holt played for North Carolina under Mac Brown from 1992 to 1995, as a long snapper for the Tar Heels.

Coaching career

Early Coaching Career
Holt began his coaching career at Norwich University in 1996 as the team’s special teams coordinator and linebackers coach. In 1997 he worked as a running backs coach at Mainland High School in Florida. From 1998 to 1999 he worked as a graduate assistant at Western Carolina. In he worked with the defensive line and special teams at Cumberland. In 2001 he was at Bethune-Cookman  as the inside linebackers and special teams coach. The following two years 
he served as the head coach at New Smyrna Beach H.S. in New Smyrna Beach, Florida.

Western Kentucky
From 2004 to 2009 Holt coached at Western Kentucky, as the team's running backs coach where he also worked as the team's special teams coordinator in 2005 and 2009. In 2010 he spent one year as the running backs coach with one season at Tennessee State before returning to Western Kentucky. In 2011 and 2012 he coached tackles and tight ends for Western Kentucky.

USF
Holt spent 2013 and 2014 at the University of South Florida, where he was serving as the Bulls' tight ends coach and special teams coordinator. He was originally hired at USF as director of player personnel in 2013 but ultimately was made the team's special teams coordinator prior to the 2013 season. Holt was nominated for the Broyles Award at the end of the season after USF's special teams improved in almost every statistical category even with the loss of key performers. In 2014 he added the responsibility of coaching the tight ends for the Bulls.

Appalachian State
In 2015 Holt became the running backs coach for Appalachian State, in 2016 he added the special teams duties which held until 2018.

Louisville
Holt followed Scott Satterfield and was hired as the tight ends coach and special teams coordinator at Louisville in December of 2018. He coached  at Louisville until the end of the 2021 season.

Virginia Tech
Brent Pry announced on December 10, 2021 that Stu Holt would join his staff and serve as the special teams coordinator/running backs coach for the Virginia Tech Hokies.

References 

1972 births
Living people
North Carolina Tar Heels football players
Western Carolina University alumni
Norwich Cadets football coaches
Western Carolina Catamounts football coaches
Cumberland Phoenix football coaches
Bethune–Cookman Wildcats football coaches
Western Kentucky Hilltoppers football coaches
South Florida Bulls football coaches
Appalachian State Mountaineers football coaches
Louisville Cardinals football coaches
Virginia Tech Hokies football coaches
Players of American football from North Carolina
Coaches of American football from North Carolina